Route 83 is a state highway in western Missouri.  Its northern terminus is at U.S. Route 65/Route 7 at Warsaw; its southern terminus is at Route 13 in Bolivar.  It is a two-lane highway its entire length.

Major intersections

References

083
Transportation in Polk County, Missouri
Transportation in Hickory County, Missouri
Transportation in Benton County, Missouri